Gaspard Le Roux was a French harpsichordist active in Paris at the beginning of the 18th century. Little is known of his life, which is exacerbated by the commonality of his name among musicians and dance instructors in Paris. The name is also found in Nicolas de Blégny's , although no address is included; in a tax document, ; two records of Gaspard Le Roux receiving annuities through the notaire publique Alexandre Lebèvre are dated 8 May 1702 and 5 August 1706  [this is the last known reference to Le Roux]; and the record of his being granted a   dated 9 April 1705. [A previously discovered reference by French musicologist Pierre Hardouin that claimed the receipt of an inventory of Le Roux's chattels on 7 June 1707 has been proved incorrect.

Le Roux is known only for his 1705 publication, that are arranged into seven 'suites' (the term was not used by Le Roux). These were engraved by Henry de Baussen and sold , meaning Le Roux was responsible for not only the costs of engraving and printing, but also in securing the correct accreditation from the state. It was sold from the shop of Henry Foucault – "" and cost ten  '' and eleven , ten  in bound format. With the exception of the preludes and three dances, there are also found arrangements and five examples of realised , which arrange the second and bass lines of the trios as their starting points. The book suggests that Le Roux was a natural teacher, giving practical advice such as to sing the melodies and accompany them using the trios' thoroughbasses before playing them; it is also demonstrational, providing differing examples of dances and styles. If one imagines a spectrum, with Charles Dieupart (1701) at the French end, Elizabeth Jacquet de la Guerre's second book (1707) in the middle, and François Couperin in his most Italianate moments at the Italian end, Le Roux's style falls slightly to the French side of Jacquet.

Bibliography 
Gaspard Le Roux, Pieces de clavessin (Paris, 1705) ed. J Baxendale (3 volumes; Tynset: Lyrebird Music, 2020).

–––––, Pieces for Harpsichord (Paris, 1705) ed. A Fuller (Leipzig: Peters Edition, 1959).

Discography
 . Harpsichordists: William Christie and Arthur Haas. Harpsichord maker: William Dowd, after Taskin. LP . Harmonia Mundi HM 399. 08/1977

References

External links

John McKean, Gaspard Le Roux’s Pièces de Clavecin and the Harpsichord Duet: Contexts and Performance Traditions
Jon Baxendale, In Search of Gaspard Le Roux: An Assessment of Current Research.

1660s births
1707 deaths
French harpsichordists
French Baroque composers
French male classical composers
18th-century keyboardists
17th-century male musicians